Robert Jamal Davis (born April 2, 1995) is a former American football wide receiver. He played college football at Georgia State, and was drafted by the Washington Redskins in the sixth round of the 2017 NFL Draft. He has also played for the Philadelphia Eagles.

College career

Davis played for Georgia State University from 2013 through 2016 and was honored as All-Sun Belt (first-team) in 2015 and 2016 and as All-Sun Belt (honorable mention) in 2014.  He finished as Georgia State’s career leader in receptions (222) and receiving yards (3,391), which broke the records of his former teammate Albert Wilson.  Davis finished second to Wilson with 17 touchdown receptions, 10 100-yard games and 3,394 all-purpose yards.  Davis had at least one reception in every game he played (49 straight), the longest active streak in FBS at the time. Davis stands second in Sun Belt history (to T. Y. Hilton, FIU, 3,531) in career receiving yards, fifth in receptions and finished ranked eighth among all active FBS players in career receiving yards and thirteenth in receptions.

Professional career

Washington Redskins
Davis was drafted by Washington Redskins in the sixth round, 209th overall, in the 2017 NFL Draft. On September 2, 2017, he was waived by the team and was signed to the practice squad the next day. He was promoted to the active roster on December 4, 2017.

On August 13, 2018, Davis was placed on injured reserve after suffering a broken tibia and a torn LCL during training camp, keeping him out the entire 2018 season. Davis was waived by the Redskins on September 7, 2019 and re-signed to the practice squad. He was promoted to the active roster on September 13, 2019. He was waived again on October 1, 2019.

Philadelphia Eagles
On October 7, 2019, Davis was signed to the Philadelphia Eagles practice squad. He was promoted to the active roster on December 12, 2019.

Davis was waived/injured by the Eagles on August 25, 2020, and subsequently reverted to the team's injured reserve list the next day. He was waived with an injury settlement on September 3.

Las Vegas Raiders
On September 28, 2020, Davis was signed to the Las Vegas Raiders practice squad. He was placed on the practice squad/injured list on October 27, and restored to the practice squad on December 4. He was released on December 5, 2020.

Personal life
Davis' older cousin is retired NFL linebacker Thomas Davis.

References

External links
 Georgia State bio
Washington Redskins bio

1995 births
Living people
African-American players of American football
Players of American football from Georgia (U.S. state)
People from Warner Robins, Georgia
American football wide receivers
Georgia State Panthers football players
Washington Redskins players
Philadelphia Eagles players
Las Vegas Raiders players
21st-century African-American sportspeople